The 1993 UCI Track Cycling World Championships were held at Vikingskipet in Hamar, Norway, from 17 to 29 August 1993. Eleven events were held, eight for men and three for women, with five world records being set.

Venue

The Championships were hosted in Vikingskipet, an indoor speed skating rink which opened in 1992 for the 1994 Winter Olympics. Originally the plan had been to construct a velodrome in Oslo, but instead it was decided to erect a temporary track within the Hamar venue. The temporary structure cost NOK 15 million, and was dismantled after the world championships.

Medal summary

Medal table

References

Uci Track Cycling World Championships, 1993
Track cycling
UCI Track Cycling World Championships by year
Track Cycling World Championships